Yosvany Aguilera Zamora (born January 6, 1975 in Granma) is a boxer from Cuba.

He participated in the 1996 Summer Olympics for his native Caribbean country. There he was stopped in the second round of the light-flyweight (– 48 kg) division by Philippines' eventual runner-up Mansueto Velasco. Aguilera also competed at the 2000 Summer Olympics.

Aguilera won the bronze medal in the featherweight (– 57 kg) division at the Pan American Games in Santo Domingo.

References
Profile

1975 births
Flyweight boxers
Featherweight boxers
Boxers at the 1996 Summer Olympics
Boxers at the 2000 Summer Olympics
Boxers at the 2003 Pan American Games
Olympic boxers of Cuba
Living people
Cuban male boxers
Pan American Games bronze medalists for Cuba
Pan American Games medalists in boxing
Medalists at the 2003 Pan American Games
People from Granma Province
21st-century Cuban people